Alex Huynh (born September 7) is a Vietnamese American martial artist and stunt man. He specializes in wushu, training at the United States Wushu Academy, and lives in Southern California, after growing up in Roanoke, Virginia and attending Northside High School.

As a stunt man, he appears in the 2004 short movie The Young Master, the 2006 movie Safe, and most notably Pirates of the Caribbean. He also appears in martial demonstrations, most notably demonstrating Zui Quan in Fight Science.

As a martial artist, he has made his mark as a three-time gold medalist in the Pan American Wushu Games.

References

External links
 
 "A former Roanoke man is making his mark in Hollywood"

American wushu practitioners
American stunt performers
Place of birth missing (living people)
American people of Vietnamese descent
Year of birth missing (living people)
Living people
Sportspeople from Roanoke, Virginia
Male actors from Virginia